Xuedong David Huang (born October 20, 1962) is a Chinese American computer scientist and technology executive who has made contributions to spoken language processing and Azure AI, including Azure OpenAI Services. He is Microsoft's Technical Fellow and Azure AI Chief Technology Officer. Huang is a strong advocate of AI for Good, AI for Accessibility, and AI for Cultural Heritage.

Education
Huang received his PhD from the University of Edinburgh in 1989 (sponsored by the British ORS and Edinburgh University Scholarship), his MS from Tsinghua University in 1984, and BS from Hunan University in 1982.

Career
After receiving his PhD in 1989, Huang joined Carnegie Mellon University and worked with Raj Reddy and Kai-Fu Lee on speech recognition. At CMU, he directed the Sphinx-II speech system research which achieved the best performance in every category of DARPA's 1992 benchmarking. Microsoft Research recruited him to found and lead Microsoft's spoken language initiatives in 1993. His co-authored book Spoken Language Processing and his Historical speech recognition review succinctly summarize several generations of spoken language research. As Microsoft's Mr. Speech for three decades, Huang has been instrumental in creating Microsoft's Speech Application Programming Interface (SAPI), shipping Microsoft Speech Server, and modernizing spoken language and integrative AI services  via Azure AI, which not only enables millions of 3rd party customers but also powers up Microsoft's Windows, Office, Teams, and Azure OpenAI GPT services.

Huang helped Microsoft and Azure Cognitive Services achieve multiple industry's first human parity milestones on the following open research tasks: transcribing conversational speech, machine translation, conversational QnA, and computer vision image captioning.

Huang has made significant contributions to the software and AI industry through his executive leadership and his scientific publications, owning more than 170 US patents and impacting billions through Azure AI enabled products and services. In 2016, Wired magazine named him one of 25 Geniuses. In 2021, Azure AI was named the winner of InfoWorld's Technology of the Year Award.

Huang was awarded the Allen Newell research excellence medal in 1992, and IEEE Speech Processing Best Paper in 1993. He was recognized as an IEEE Fellow by Institute of Electrical and Electronics Engineers in 2000, and named ACM Fellow by Association for Computing Machinery in 2017. Huang received 2022 Asian American Corporate Leadership Award, and IEEE Amar Bose Industrial Leader Award for contributions in speech recognition and industrial leadership in artificial intelligence. In 2023, he was elected a member of the US National Academy of Engineering (NAE), for technical contributions and leadership in speech and language technologies and products including the development of cloud-based intelligent systems.

References

1962 births
Living people
Chinese emigrants to the United States
Fellow Members of the IEEE
Tsinghua University alumni
Carnegie Mellon University faculty
Scientists from Hunan
Alumni of the University of Edinburgh
Microsoft employees
Chinese computer scientists
Fellows of the Association for Computing Machinery
Speech processing researchers
Hunan University alumni
American computer scientists
Natural language processing researchers
Computer scientists